Monte Carpegna is a mountain of Marche, Italy. It is the source of the Conca river.

References

Mountains of Marche
Mountains of the Apennines